Vildsvin was a Swedish rock band from Varberg. They are known for their hits Saga utan lyckligt slut and Vi ses igen.

Members
 Fredrik Thomander - vocals, bass
 Roger Öjersson - guitar
 Peter Månsson - drums

Albums
 Grisfesten (1995)
 Till Eder Tjänst (1996)
 Iskallt Begär (1997)

References

Swedish rock music groups